An ethnographic village is a real or artificial settlement which portrays historical and ethnographic characteristics of life of a certain ethnic group. The concept is close to that of an open-air museum or "living museum."

Ethnographic village exhibitions

As early as in 1550 a mock Brazilian village was built by Rouen, France, on an occasion of the entry of king Henry II of France. For this purpose, Brazilian flora and fauna were imported, and typical Amerindian dwellings were built. The village was populated by 50 original Tabajara and  Tupinambá people as well as about 250 French dressed as "natives".

Similar "Negro villages"  has become increasingly common in various places, becoming a staple feature of international exhibitions of late 19th-early 20th centuries,  such as the 1889 Paris Exposition.

Since these villages commonly emphasized the backwards, "savage" ways of life as compared to European civilization, the concept was criticized as a manifestation of racism.

Real settlements

Lithuania

In modern Lithuania, an ethnographic village is defined as a rural settlement  which maintains traditional, historical, ethnic cultural characteristics specific to the particular region. These characteristic include traditional architecture, farmstead planning, relation to the natural landscape, as well as traditional life, including farming traditions, arts and crafts.

See also
 Ethnographic group
 Thematic village
 Tourist village (Indonesia)

References

 
Ethnography
Types of museums
Types of village